Helen Freedman is a former judge who served in the New York State court system for 36 years. From 2008 to 2014, she served as an associate justice of the New York Appellate Division of the Supreme Court, First Judicial Department.

Early life and education
Freedman is a 1963 graduate of Smith College and a 1967 graduate of New York University School of Law.

Legal career
Freedman was elected as a Democrat to the New York City Civil Court in 1978. She served on that court 1979 to 1984. She was a New York Supreme Court Justice, from 1984 to 2008. She served on the Appellate Term of the Supreme Court, First Department, from 1995 to 1999 and later sat on the Commercial Division of the Supreme Court. In 2008, she was designated a Justice for the Appellate Division, First Judicial Department in 2008 by Governor David Paterson, and served in that position until she retired from the court effective October 31, 2014.

She also served on the Pattern Jury Instructions Committee of the Association of Justices of the New York Supreme Court and as a member of the New York State and Federal Judicial Council. She was also an adjunct Professor of Law at New York Law School.

She now serves as a mediator with JAMS.

References

Living people
New York (state) lawyers
Lawyers from New York City
Year of birth missing (living people)